Rundhøi or Rundhøe is a mountain in Lom Municipality in Innlandet county, Norway. The mountain is surrounded by several other notable mountains including Kyrkja, Stehøi, and Stetinden to the southeast; Surtningstinden to the south; Storebjørn, Veslebjørn, and Sokse to the southwest; Store Smørstabbtinden and Kniven to the west; and Storbreahøe and Storbreatinden to the northwest.

See also
List of mountains of Norway by height

References

Jotunheimen
Lom, Norway
Mountains of Innlandet